Disodium 5'-ribonucleotides or I+G, E number E635, is a flavor enhancer which is synergistic with glutamates in creating the taste of umami. It is a mixture of disodium inosinate (IMP) and disodium guanylate (GMP) and is often used where a food already contains natural glutamates (as in meat extract) or added monosodium glutamate (MSG).  It is primarily used in flavored noodles, snack foods, chips, crackers, sauces and fast foods. It is produced by combining the sodium salts of the natural compounds guanylic acid (E626) and inosinic acid (E630).

A mixture composed of 98% monosodium glutamate and 2% E635 has four times the flavor enhancing power of monosodium glutamate (MSG) alone.

Side effects and safety
Disodium 5'-ribonucleotides were first assessed in 1974 by the Joint FAO/WHO Expert Committee on Food Additives based on all available scientific literature. This assessment resulted in a new specification prepared and an "ADI Not Specified". This essentially means that this additive shows no toxicology at any level and acceptable daily limits do not need to be set. The definition is as follows:-

In 1993 the Joint FAO/WHO Expert Committee on Food Additives considered several more studies on this food additive and retained the "ADI not specified" safety classification.

See also
 List of food additives
 Ribonucleotide

References

Food additives
Flavor enhancers
Umami enhancers
E-number additives
Ribosides